Magnite may refer to:

 Nissan Magnite, a subcompact crossover SUV model
 Magnite Inc, an American online advertising technology firm formerly known as Rubicon Project

See also 

 Magnetite, a rock mineral